The Scipion was a 74-gun  of the French Navy.

She was commissioned in 1813, captained by Louis François Richard Barthélémy de Saizieu. She was refitted in 1823.

On 30 September 1827, she collided with Provence, which sustained serious damage and had to return to Toulon for repairs.

On 20 October 1827, she took part in the Battle of Navarino, under Pierre Bernard Milius, sailing behind the Sirène in the line. Sirène, Trident and Scipion then proceeded to silence the batteries of the fort of Navarino.

She was eventually struck in 1846.

References and sources 

Ships of the line of the French Navy
Téméraire-class ships of the line
1813 ships